Wiedmann is a German surname. Notable people with the surname include:

Frederik Wiedmann (born 1981), German composer
Siegfried K. Wiedmann (born 1938), German electrical engineer
Willy Wiedmann (1929–2013), German artist, writer and art dealer

See also
Stump Wiedman (1861–1905), American baseball player
Wiedemann

German-language surnames